This is a list of Kellogg School of Management alumni.

Academia 

Sally Blount (PhD in Organizational Behavior 1992), Dean and Michael L. Nemmers Professor of Management and Organizations at Kellogg School of Management at Northwestern University
Eric Ghysels (PhD in Managerial Economics and Decision Science 1985), Edward M. Bernstein Distinguished Professor of Economics and Professor of Finance at University of North Carolina Chapel Hill
Venkatesh Shankar (PhD in Marketing 1995), Professor of Marketing and Coleman Chair in Marketing, Director of Research at the Center for Retailing Studies at Mays Business School at Texas A&M University
George Stigler (MBA 1932), Professor of Economics, University of Chicago, 1982 Nobel Prize
Maxim Sytch  (PhD, 2011), Professor of Management and Organizations at the Ross School of Business at the University of Michigan.
Glen L. Urban (PhD Managerial Economics and Decision Sciences, 1966), Dean Emeritus of MIT Sloan School of Management.

Professional services

James L. Allen, Founder of Booz Allen Hamilton consultancy, and namesake of the Kellogg School's executive education center
Arthur E. Andersen, Founder of Arthur Andersen
Edwin G. Booz, Founder of Booz Allen Hamilton consultancy

Financial services
Joseph E. Hasten - President & CEO, ShoreBank; former Vice Chairman, U.S. Bancorp
Scott J. Freidheim, president and CEO of CDI Corporation
Suzanne Iroche, CEO of FinBank
David Kabiller, billionaire co-founder of AQR Capital
Gary Parr, Deputy Chairman of Lazard
William A. Osborn, Chairman and former CEO of Northern Trust Corporation
Patrick Ryan, Founder and Executive Chairman of Aon Corporation
Jaime Ruiz Sacristán, Chairman of the Mexican Stock Exchange (2015–2020)
Thomas J. Wilson, President and CEO of Allstate Insurance Company
Jeffrey W. Ubben, Co-founder, CEO and CIO of ValueAct Capital
Dean Chamberlain, CEO of Mischler Financial Group; former Joint Head of Fixed Income for Americas at Nomura Holdings, Inc

Consumer goods
Douglas R. Conant, President and CEO of Campbell Soup Company
Robert A. Eckert, partner at Friedman Fleischer & Lowe
Betsy Holden, former CEO of Kraft Foods
S. Curtis Johnson, Former chairman of Diversey, Inc. 
Roshni Nadar, executive director and CEO of HCL Enterprise.
Aman Gupta, Co Founder and CMO at boAt Lifestyle.
Tony Vernon, former CEO of Kraft Foods Group
Bob Gamgort, CEO of Keurig Dr Pepper, former CEO of Pinnacle Foods
Peter Thum, founder, Ethos Water and entrepreneur
Salman Amin, CEO of Pladis Global

Retail
Brad Blum, CEO Emeritus of Burger King
Steve Odland, Chairman and CEO of Office Depot
Gregg Steinhafel, President, CEO, Chairman of the Board, Target Corporation
Larry Levy, founder of Levy Restaurants
Joey Wat, CEO of Yum China Holdings

Media, sports, and entertainment
 Ted Phillips, president and CEO, Chicago Bears
 Jeff Luhnow, former president and general manager, Houston Astros
 Mallika Chopra, author, President of Intent
 Eddie George, professional football player, Heisman Trophy winner
 Rick Hahn, general manager of the Chicago White Sox
 Ben Thompson, writer of Stratechery
 Kei Ogura, singer, songwriter and composer

Industry
Kushagra Bajaj, Vice Chairman, Bajaj Hindusthan
E.Scott Conti, CEO of Illinois Tool Works
Barry Cottle, CEO of Scientific Games Corporation
Andrew Fastow, former CFO, Enron
Scott J. Freidheim, President and CEO of CDI Corporation
Ravin Gandhi, Founder of GMM Nonstick Coatings
Vinita D. Gupta, CEO of Lupin Limited
Christopher G. Kennedy, Chairman, Joseph P. Kennedy Enterprises
David Kohler, President and CEO, Kohler Company
Chris Kubasik, Chair and CEO, L3Harris Technologies
Ellen J. Kullman, Chair and CEO, DuPont
Ivan Menezes, CEO of Diageo
Alex Molinaroli, CEO of Johnson Controls
Roshni Nadar, Executive Director and CEO, HCL Corporation
Steve Odland, president and CEO of the Committee for Economic Development
Darren Woods, Chairman and CEO, ExxonMobil

Government

Ali Babacan, Deputy Prime Minister of Turkey, 2009–2015.
Charlie Baker, Governor of Massachusetts, 2015–present
Esteban Bullrich, Argentine National Deputy for Frente PRO, 2005-2009. 2010 to present, Minister of Education, City of Buenos Aires
John Cebrowski, member of the New Hampshire House of Representatives
Alexander De Croo, Belgian Prime Minister of Belgium
Robert Dold, member of the U.S. House of Representatives from Illinois, 2011-2013; 2015-2017
Jonathan Greenblatt, Special Assistant to the President and Director of the Office of Social Innovation and Civic Participation in the Domestic Policy Council for the Obama Administration, 2011 to present.
John Hoeven, Governor of North Dakota, 2000-2010; Senator, 2011 to present, United States
Randy Hopper Wisconsin State Senator, 2009-2011
Somkid Jatusripitak (PhD Marketing, 1984), Deputy Prime Minister of Thailand, 2015 to present; former Minister of Finance and Minister of Commerce of Thailand, 2001-2006
 Suvit Maesincee, Vice Minister for the Prime Minister and Adviser to the Minister of Finance of Thailand, 2015 to present
Ada Osakwe, former Adviser to Nigeria’s Minister of Agriculture and Rural Development
 Susan Pamerleau, retired United States Air Force major general and the Republican sheriff of Bexar County, Texas, first woman elected to that office, 2012
Cesar Purisima, Secretary of Trade & Industry, Republic of the Philippines, 2004-2005; Secretary of Finance, Republic of the Philippines, 2010-2016 
 Uttama Savanayana, Minister of Information and Communication Technology of Thailand, 2015 to present
Brad Schneider, member of the U.S. House of Representatives from Illinois, 2013-2015; 2018–present
Pramila Jayapal, member of the U.S. House of Representatives from Washington, 2016–present
Cindy Axne, member of the U.S. House of Representatives from Iowa, 2019–present

Technology

Christopher Galvin, Former Chairman and CEO of Motorola
Ginni Rometty, Former CEO of IBM (2012-2020)
Bill McDermott, CEO of ServiceNow, Former CEO of SAP (2010-2019)
Michael Hayford, CEO of NCR Corporation
Martin Lau, President of Tencent
Wen Yunsong, CEO of Unihub Global Networks
Sasan Goodarzi, CEO of Intuit
Jalak Jobanputra, Founder of  FuturePerfect Ventures
Roshni Nadar, Chairperson of HCL Technologies

Non-profit
Roslyn M. Brock (MBA 1999), Chairman of the National Association for the Advancement of Colored People
Roshni Nadar (MBA 2008), Founder and CEO of the Shiv Nadar Foundation
John Wood (MBA 1989), Founder and CEO of Room to Read
Susan Abrams (MM 1990), CEO of the Illinois Holocaust Museum and Education Center

References

Northwestern University